The River Wenning is a tributary of the River Lune, flowing through North Yorkshire and Lancashire.

The Wenning is formed from the confluence of Clapham Beck, which rises above Clapham, and Austwick Beck, which rises in Crummackdale above Austwick.  It then flows westwards through High Bentham, Low Bentham and Wennington.

This river's valley, together with Airedale, Wharfedale and upper Ribblesdale, make up the district of Craven.

Wenning, River
Wenning
River Wenning
Wenning
1Wenning